Hornsey is a surname. Notable people with the surname include:

Kate Hornsey (born 1981), Australian rower
Tom Hornsey (born 1989), Australian-born American football punter